Dendrogaster is a genus of crustaceans belonging to the family Dendrogastridae.

The genus has cosmopolitan distribution.

Species

Species:

Dendrogaster antarctica 
Dendrogaster arborescens 
Dendrogaster arbusculus

References

Maxillopoda genera